The Verse of Mawadda (Arabic: آية الْمَوَدَّة) refers to verse 42:23 of the Quran, the interpretation of which is disputed. This verse is often cited in Shia sources to support the elevated status of the family of the Islamic prophet Muhammad, known as the Ahl al-Bayt. Most Sunni authors reject the Shia view and offer various alternatives. The Verse of Mawadda includes the passage

Shia view 
The word "kinsfolk" in this verse is interpreted in Shia exegeses as Muhammad's kin, the Ahl al-Bayt. Ibn Ishaq similarly narrates that the prophet specified  as his daughter Fatima, her husband Ali, and their two sons, Hasan and Husayn. Quoted by Madelung, Hasan referred to the Verse of Mawadda in his inaugural speech as the caliph after the assassination of his father in 661:

The quote above contains the last sentence of the Verse of Mawadda. Al-Basri later changed his mind, saying that this verse means gaining proximity to God through obedience to him. This and other prevalent Sunni interpretations of the Verse of Mawadda are challenged in a theological argument attributed to the Shia Imam Muhammad al-Baqir, who also labeled al-Basri a "misconstruer of God's words".

In Twelver Shia, this love also entails obedience to the Ahl al-Bayt as the source of exoteric and esoteric guidance. This obedience is believed to benefit the faithful first and foremost, citing the following passage of verse 34:47, which contains the passage, "Say, 'I ask not of you any reward; that shall be yours.'"

Sunni view 
Some Sunni commentators agree with the Shia view, including Baydawi, Razi, and Ibn Maghazili. Most Sunni authors, however, reject the Shia view and offer various alternatives. The view preferred by al-Tabari is that the Verse of Mawadda instructs Muslims to love the prophet because of their blood relations to him. Madelung rejects this view because the Verse of Mawadda was likely revealed in Medina, where many Muslims did not have family ties with Muhammad. Instead, Madelung suggests that the Verse of Mawadda demands love towards relatives in general, saying that the wording does not agree with the Shia interpretation. Alternatively, Ibn Ajiba suggests that the present ending creates a more emphatic injunction to love Muhammad's kin.

See also

References

Sources 
 
 
 
 
 
 

Quranic verses
Islamic ethics
Philosophy of love
Family